The Journal of Religion and Health (JORH) is an interdisciplinary peer-reviewed academic journal. The journal was founded in 1961 by the Blanton-Peale Institute and published by Springer Science+Business Media. JORH seeks to publish contemporary religious, pastoral and spiritual care research which utilizes current medical, psychological and sociological theories and praxis. Several academic bibliometric analyses have noted JORH over the last decade which are publicly available (Lucchetti & Lucchetti, 2014; Senel & Demir, 2018; Demir, 2019), the most extensive covering from 1961 - 2021 (Carey, Kumar, Goyle & Ali, 2023).

Abstracting and indexing 
The journal is abstracted and indexed by in the following bibliographic databases:

References

External links 
 

Publications established in 1961
Religious studies journals
Healthcare journals
Springer Science+Business Media academic journals
Quarterly journals
English-language journals
Religion and health